This Is a Stick Up... Don't Make It a Murder is the first full-length album from Hit the Lights.

Recording
Three of the tracks that were featured on their previous EP Until We Get Caught were re-recorded for this album. There are guest appearances from Just Surrender, Kick Over The Traces and Race the Sun.

Release
In November 2005, the band supported Hot Rod Circuit on their headlining US tour. For the first half of February 2006, they wet on tour with the Spill Canvas. From late February to late March 2006, the band supported A Thorn for Every Heart on their US tour, leading to an appearance at the South by Southwest music conference. The band went on the 2006 edition of the Take Action Tour in early-to-mid April. This Is a Stick Up... Don't Make It a Murder was released on April 11, 2006 on Triple Crown Records. In April and May, the band went on tour with I Am the Avalanche, The Receiving End of Sirens and As Tall as Lions. From late May to early June, the band supported Bayside on their Lions Tigers and Bears Tour. Following this, they appeared at The Bamboozle festival, and went on the Warped Tour. In August and September, the band supported Paramore on their tour of the U.S. Following this, they appeared at the Bamboozle Left festival. In March and April 2007, the band headlined the Let It Ride Tour, alongside Valencia, Just Surrender, the Secret Handshake, All Time Low, Love Arcade and Forgive Durden. Following this, they appeared at The Bamboozle festival. On June 28, it was announced that vocalist Colin Ross had left the group. Ross explained that he "decided I would like to take a different direction with my life and not live this lifestyle any longer." Subsequently, guitarist Nick Thompson became their vocalist.

Reception

By July 2006, the album sold over 13,000 copies, and by January 2007, 30,000 copies had been sold.

The album was included at number 37 on Rock Sounds "The 51 Most Essential Pop Punk Albums of All Time" list.

Track listing

Notes
 All songs are written by Hit the Lights
 The track "Until We Get Caught" was featured on the video game Madden NFL 07, with the album title shortened to This Is a Stick Up….
There is an acoustic hidden track, at 8:42 on "Make a Run for It". On iTunes, the hidden track is released separately as "Acoustic", and "Make a Run for It" is only 4:11 long.

Personnel
Colin Ross - Lead Vocals

Nick Thompson - Rhythm Guitar, Backing Vocals

Omar Zehery - Lead Guitar

David Bermosk - Bass Guitar, Backing Vocals

Nathan Van Damme - Drums

References
 Citations

Sources

External links

This Is a Stick Up... Don't Make It a Murder at YouTube (streamed copy where licensed)

2006 debut albums
Hit the Lights albums
Triple Crown Records albums
Albums produced by Matt Squire